Harry Haraldsen (19 November 1911, Rjukan – 28 May 1966) was a Norwegian speed skater who competed in the 1936 Winter Olympics. In 1936 he finished seventh in the 1500 metres competition and 34th in the 500 metres event.

He was also a cyclist and competed in the 1000m time trial at the 1936 Summer Olympics.

References

External links
 Speed skating 1936  

1911 births
1966 deaths
Norwegian male speed skaters
Olympic speed skaters of Norway
Speed skaters at the 1936 Winter Olympics
Norwegian male cyclists
Olympic cyclists of Norway
Cyclists at the 1936 Summer Olympics
Place of death missing
World Allround Speed Skating Championships medalists